SS Santa Rosa may refer to:

, a screw steamer launched in 1884 and wrecked in 1911
, was a passenger and cargo ocean liner built in 1916 and sunk in 1942
, was a passenger and cargo ocean liner built in 1932 and scrapped in 1989
 was a passenger and cargo ocean liner built in 1958 and scrapped in 2012.

Santa Rosa